Crawford Wilkerson, better known as Hi-C, is an American rapper from Philadelphia, Pennsylvania. He is known for his collaborations with DJ Quik, AMG, Cartis Bunny and 2nd II None. Hi-C was also a member of the Tree Top Piru and DALE LANE BLOODS.

Discography

Studio albums
Skanless (1991)
Swing'n (1993)
The Hi-Life Hustle (2003)

Singles

Soundtrack appearances

Guest appearances

Filmography 
Dead Homiez (1996)
Malibu's Most Wanted (2003)

References

Living people
African-American male rappers
Musicians from Compton, California
American hip hop record producers
African-American record producers
West Coast hip hop musicians
Bloods
21st-century American rappers
Record producers from California
21st-century American male musicians
1973 births
21st-century African-American musicians
20th-century African-American people